This is a list of programs that were broadcast on BBC Canada until the network's closure on December 31, 2020.

Former programming

 55 Degrees North
 Absolute Power
 According to Bex
 Afterlife
 Agent vs Agent
 Alan Carr: Chatty Man
 Alan Clark Diaries
 Ancestors in the Attic
 Antiques Roadshow
 Ashes to Ashes
 At the End Of My Leash
 Auf Wiedersehen Pet
 Bargain Hunt
 Beachcomber Cottage
 Beautiful People
 Big City Broker
 The Big Flip
 Blackadder
 The Body Farm
 Britain's Worst Driver
 Border Force
 Border Security (Australia)
 Build a New Life
 The Catherine Tate Show
 Celeb
 Celebrity Fantasy Homes
 Colin & Justin's Home Heist
 Come Fly With Me
 Conviction
 Coupling
 Countdown to Murder
 The Crouches
 Cutting It
 Dalziel and Pascoe
 Daniel Deronda
 Dead Ringers
 Death in Holy Orders
 Death in Paradise
 Debbie Travis’ Facelift
 Design Inc.
 Dragons' Den (UK)
 Dream Home Abroad
 EastEnders
 Escape to the Country
 The F Word
 The Fades
 Fantasy Homes by the Sea
 Fawlty Towers
 Find Me The Face
 The Fix
 Flog It!
 Free Agents
 Fresh and Wild
 Friday Night Dinner
 From Darkness
 Garden Invaders
 Gavin & Stacey
 The Graham Norton Show
 Hell's Kitchen (UK)
 Holiday Showdown
 Holmes Inspection
 Holmes Makes it Right
 Holmes on Homes
 Home To Stay
 Homes Under The Hammer
 The Hotel Inspector
 How Not to Live Your Life
 How the Other Half Live
 Ideal
 Inspector Lynley
 The Jonathan Ross Show
 Judge John Deed
 Junk Brothers
 Kitchen Nightmares
 The Kumars at No. 42
 The Lakes
 Law and Order: UK
 Life Laundry
 Life on Mars
 A Likeness in Stone
 Little Britain
 Little Britain Abroad
 Living The Dream
 Location, Location, Location
 Luther
 Make My Body Younger
 Manchild
 Mary Queen of Shops
 Mersey Beat
 Million Pound Property Experiment
 Misfits
 Monroe
 Neat
 The Omid Djalili Show
 The Other Boleyn Girl
 PA'S
 A Place to Call Home
 Property Virgins
 Put Your Money Where Your Mouth Is
 Ramsay's Best Restaurant
 Ramsay's Kitchen Nightmares
 Real Men
 Real Renos
 The Really Big Flip
 Restaurant Makeover
 Rich Bride, Poor Bride
 Robin Hood
 Room Rivals
 Room Service
 The Royal Bodyguard
 Scott & Bailey
 Servants
 Spa/Teen Spa
 Spooks
 State of Play
 Strange
 Swiss Toni
 Tamasin’s Weekends
 The Thin Blue Line
 This Small Space
 Til Debt Do Us Part
 TLC
 Top Gear
 Torchwood
 Total Wipeout
 A Town & Country Murder
 Trading Up In The Sun
 Two Pints of Lager and a Packet of Crisps
 The Unsellables
 The Unsellables (UK)
 Waking The Dead
 Wedding SOS
 Wei in Pass Me The Soap
 What Not to Wear
 The World's Toughest Driving Tests
 Would You Rather?

See also
List of programs broadcast by the BBC
BBC Canada
BBC
List of programs broadcast by BBC America

References

 http://www.bbccanada.com/Schedule/
 http://www.bbccanada.com/Series/
 https://web.archive.org/web/20120516052633/http://www.channelcanada.com/Article1937.html
 http://www.falltvpreview.com/channel.php?id=10

External links
 BBC Canada official website

BBC